Sefton Central is a constituency represented by Bill Esterson of the Labour Party since 2010.

Boundaries

History of boundaries
The constituency was created for the 2010 general election, replacing much of Crosby along with part of Knowsley North and Sefton East. The new constituency covers Merseyside northern residential suburban areas of Crosby, Blundellsands, Brighton-Le-Sands, Little Crosby, Thornton, and Hightown, Formby and Maghull and the villages and localities of Aintree, Carr Houses, Freshfield, Ince Blundell, Kennessee Green, Lady Green, Little Altcar, Lunt, Lydiate, Melling, Sefton, and Waddicar, in the Metropolitan Borough of Sefton. The constituency has electoral wards:

Blundellsands
Harington
Manor
Molyneux
Park
Ravenmeols
Sudell

History
This seat was fought for the first time at the 2010 general election.

At the time, eleven of the constituency's twenty-one councillors were Conservatives followed by the Liberal Democrats who had ten, whereas analysis by Rallings and Thrasher indicated that had the Sefton Central constituency existed in 2005, the result would have been: Labour 45.6%, Conservative 33.6%, LibDem 19.2%, giving a Labour majority of 4,950. Some Conservative campaign billboard posters for the Tory candidate Deborah Jones had been defaced during the 2010 election, as had been the case during the 2005 election in Crosby.  The Labour Party candidate's majority was 3,862 suggesting a moderate two-party swing.

The area covered by this seat and its immediate predecessor Crosby was historically a strong area for the Conservatives. However, since Labour gained that seat in the 1997 election, they have held it with fairly comfortable margins for 20 years. In 2015, an 8.1% swing to Labour saw them take the area with their biggest ever majority of 11,846 votes (24.2%), in accordance with the significant swing to Labour in Merseyside compared to 2010; this margin was surpassed in 2017, as Labour won more than 60% of the vote in the seat and a majority of over 30% for the first time. This suggests that since 2010, Sefton Central has changed from a key marginal between the major parties to a Labour safe seat.

Constituency profile
The constituency has a working population whose income is close to the national average, and close to average reliance on social housing.  At the end of 2012, the unemployment rate in the constituency stood as 2.4% of the population claiming Jobseeker's Allowance, compared to the regional average of 4.2%. The borough contributing to the seat has a medium 28.5% of its population without a car, 25.1% of the population without any qualifications and a 24.1% with Level 4 qualifications or above. In terms of tenure, 70.5% of homes are owned outright or on a mortgage as at the 2011 UK Census across the district.

Members of Parliament

Elections

Elections in the 2010s

See also
List of parliamentary constituencies in Merseyside

Notes

References

Parliamentary constituencies in North West England
Politics of the Metropolitan Borough of Sefton
Constituencies of the Parliament of the United Kingdom established in 2010